Don Chaffin (born 1939) is an American engineer currently the R. G. Snyder Distinguished University Professor Emeritus at University of Michigan and an Elected Fellow to the American Institute for Medical and Biological Engineering, American Industrial Hygiene Association, Society of Automotive Engineers, American Association for the Advancement of Science, Ergonomics Society, Human Factors and Ergonomics Society.

Chaffin was also elected a member of the National Academy of Engineering in 1994 for fundamental engineering contributions to and leadership in occupational biomechanics and industrial ergonomics.

References

1939 births
Living people
Fellows of the American Association for the Advancement of Science
University of Michigan faculty
21st-century American engineers
Fellows of the American Institute for Medical and Biological Engineering